Menger is a surname. Notable people with the surname include:

 Andreas Menger (born 1972), former German football player
 Anton Menger (1841–1906), Austrian economist and author; brother of Carl Menger
 Carl Menger (1840–1921), Austrian economist and author; founder of the Austrian School of economics
 Howard Menger (1922–2009), American who claimed to have met extraterrestrials 
 Karl Menger (1902–1985), Austrian-born mathematician and son of economist Carl Menger
 Kirsten Menger-Anderson (born 1969), American fiction writer

See also 
 Menger Hotel, San Antonio Texas
 Menger sponge, a fractal curve
 Menger's theorem
 Menger–Urysohn dimension; see Inductive dimension
 Cayley–Menger determinant; see Distance geometry
 
 Manger